was a town located in Yazu District, Tottori Prefecture, Japan.

As of 2003, the town had an estimated population of 4,413 and a density of 82.22 persons per km². The total area was 53.67 km².

On March 31, 2005, Funaoka, along with the towns of Hattō and Kōge (all from Yazu District), was merged to create the town of Yazu.

External links
Yazu official website 

Dissolved municipalities of Tottori Prefecture
Yazu, Tottori